The 1929 Oglethorpe Stormy Petrels football team represented Oglethorpe University as member of the Southern Intercollegiate Athletic Association (SIAA) during the 1929 college football season. The highlight of the season was the victory over Georgia.

Schedule

References

Oglethorpe
Oglethorpe Stormy Petrels football seasons
Oglethorpe Stormy Petrels football